2018 Azul Claro Numazu season.

J3 League

References

External links
 J.League official site

Azul Claro Numazu
Azul Claro Numazu seasons